Typha varsobica is a plant species native to Republic of Tajikistan. The species grows in freshwater marshes.

References

varsobica
Freshwater plants
Flora of Tajikistan
Plants described in 2002